Deidre Rubenstein (born 1948) is an Australian television and theatre actress, as well as a dramatist and playwright well known for her performance in Australian soap operas and main stage dramatic roles. She has won the Australian Film Institute (AFI) Award as Best Actress.

Rubenstein graduated from the National Institute of Dramatic Art in 1967 and has worked extensively in live theatre, television, films and as a narrator of audio books. She has produced a significant body of work as a narrator of audio books and has won several awards in this field.

Television work
Rubenstein has worked in television comedies, drama, mini-series and TV movies. In 1970 she appeared in an episode of Homicide. She played a guest role in Prisoner (1979–80), as terrorist Janet Dominguez. In 2004 Rubenstein played the scheming Svetlanka Ristic in the soap opera Neighbours.

Films
 The Girl Who Came Late (1991), directed by Kathy Mueller
 The Inner Sanctuary (1996), directed by Chris Clarke
 Siam Sunset (1999), directed by John Polson
 Josh Jarman (2004), directed by Pip Mushin

Theatre
Rubenstein's career in the theatre includes work with several major Australian companies, including the Nimrod Theatre Company and Melbourne Theatre Company.

In 1993 she had a solo show called What's a Girl to Do?, where she performed poems written by contemporary Australian women poets.  It was later performed by Rubenstein at The Stables Theatre in Sydney (1994) and at the 1995 Edinburgh Festival.

This show inspired her to do another solo show using work commissioned for her, work that was written to be performed live.  She was awarded a Victorian Government Women Artist's Grant and commission contemporary writers to produce the performance pieces that were later and produced in a book called Confidentially yours. The first performance was in the Playbox Theatre Centre, C.U.B Malthouse, Melbourne on 11 February 1998. The writers commissioned to produce the work that became Confidentially Yours were, Janis Balodis, Andrew Bovell, Nick Enright, Michael Gurr, Daniel Keene, Joanna Murray-Smith and Debra Oswald.  Andrew Bovell wrote a pair of stories for the show that he later used in the script for the film Lantana.

In 2005 Rubenstein performed in Menopause the Musical, a comedy breaking down the taboos about menopause. With Caroline Gillmer, Susan-Ann Walker and Jane Clifton, Rubenstein, as "The Dubbo Housewife", explored the stereotypes and madness of that time in a woman's life.

In 2015 she played Gertrude Stein in the musical Loving Repeating - a Musical of Gertrude Stein in Melbourne.

Awards and nominations

 1996 – a recipient of the inaugural Women Artists Grants, a Victorian Government initiative to encourage emerging women artists living and working in Victoria.
 1998 – TDK Australian Audio Book Awards Narrator Award for Unabridged Fiction:   Dreamtime Alice by Mandy Sayer
 2001 – Vision Australia Library Awards, joint winner of the Adult Narrator of the Year Award with James Wright reading of The Architect by Jillian Watkinson.

Bibliography

External links
 
 doollee.com – Playwrights
 Candide reviews Nimrod Theatre (Retrieved 8 August 2007)

References

1948 births
Living people
AACTA Award winners
Australian dramatists and playwrights
Australian film actresses
Australian soap opera actresses
Australian stage actresses
20th-century Australian actresses
21st-century Australian actresses